The Budapesti Hírlap was a Hungarian daily newspaper published in Budapest from 16 June 1881 to 1938. Between 25 March and 28 September 1919 it was temporarily closed down. The paper had a conservative and nationalistic orientation.

References

 Kútfalvy Oszkár: Újságpaloták. Bp. Akadémiai Kiadó. 1991.
 A magyar sajtó története. II/2. kötet. 1867–1892. Szerk. Kosáry Domokos, Németh G. Béla. Bp. 1985.
 Dezsényi Béla: A magyar sajtó 250 éve. Bp. 1954-

1881 establishments in Hungary
1938 disestablishments in Hungary
Defunct newspapers published in Hungary
Hungarian-language newspapers
Newspapers published in Budapest
Daily newspapers published in Hungary
Publications established in 1881
Publications disestablished in 1938